1989 Soviet Second League was a Soviet competition in the Soviet Second League (III tier). 

It was conducted in two stages and included 195 teams. At first stage all participants were divided in 9 groups by geographical principle across the whole Soviet Union. The winners of groups would qualify to the second and final stage where they were split in three groups of three. Winners of each group in the final stage received promotion to the 1990 Soviet First League.

In addition to that the league was expected to be reduced to only three groups next season while worse teams would be relegated to the newly revived IV tier.

Zonal tournament

Zone I (Central)

Zone II (Volga/Ural)

Zone III (South)

Zone IV (Far East)

Zone V (Soviet Republics)

Zone VI (Ukraine)

Zone VII (Central Asia)

Zone VIII (Kazakhstan)

Zone IX (Caucasus)

Zone Finals

The Zone Finals lasted from October 26 to November 13.

Group 1

Group 2

Group 3

RSFSR Championship
The competition consisted of a single group which included the best Russian Federation based from each group (six groups). The competition took place in Maykop in October before the Zone Finals.

References
 All-Soviet Archive Site
 Results. RSSSF

Soviet Second League seasons
3
Soviet
Soviet